Pherothrinax pulchella is a species of tephritid or fruit flies in the genus Pherothrinax of the family Tephritidae.

Distribution
South Africa.

References

Tephritinae
Insects described in 1924
Taxa named by Mario Bezzi
Diptera of Africa